The  is a high-speed shinkansen train service jointly operated by East Japan Railway Company (JR East) and West Japan Railway Company (JR West) between  and  on the Hokuriku Shinkansen line in Japan. The shinkansen service was introduced on 14 March 2015, but the name was first used for a limited express service operated by JR West from March 1988 until March 1997.

Service outline
The Kagayaki is the fastest service operating on the Hokuriku Shinkansen line, with a total of 10 daily return workings per direction.

Rolling stock
 E7 series 12-car sets based at Nagano Depot, since 14 March 2015
 W7 series 12-car sets based at Hakusan Depot, since 14 March 2015

Kagayaki services are operated using JR East E7 series and JR West W7 series 12-car train sets based at Nagano and Hakusan depots respectively.

Pre-shinkansen
 485 series 4/6-car EMU sets (March 1988 - March 1997)

Formations
Kagayaki shinkansen services use 12-car JR East E7 series and JR West W7 series sets, formed as follows, with car 1 at the Tokyo (southern) end. Cars 1 to 10 are ordinary-class cars with 2+3 seating, car 11 is a "Green" car with 2+2 seating, and car 12 is a "Gran Class" car with 2+1 seating. All seats are reserved and non-smoking.

History

March 1988 – March 1990
From their introduction in March 1988, services were normally formed of 4-car 485 series dual-voltage (AC/DC) electric multiple units (EMUs) based at Kanazawa Depot, as shown below, with car 1 at the Kanazawa end.

March 1990 – March 1991
From March 1990, services were normally formed of 6-car Kanazawa-based 485 series EMUs, as shown below, with car 1 at the Kanazawa end. From January 1991, a "Green" (first class) car was added to the formations.

March 1991 – March 1992
From March 1991, services were normally formed of 6-car Kanazawa-based 485 series EMUs with a Green (first class) car, as shown below, with car 1 at the Kanazawa end.

March 1992 – March 1997
From March 1992, services were normally formed of 6-car Kanazawa-based 485 series EMUs, as shown below, with car 1 at the Kanazawa end and car 6 designated as a non-reserved seating car. Car 1 was divided into smoking and no-smoking sections. At busy periods, trains often ran as 8-car formations.

Shinkansen Kagayaki (March 2015 – )
From 14 March 2015, the name Kagayaki was reinstated for use on limited-stop services operating between Tokyo and Kanazawa following the opening of the Hokuriku Shinkansen beyond Nagano.

See also
 List of named passenger trains of Japan

References

External links

 JR West Kagayaki train information 

Named passenger trains of Japan
East Japan Railway Company
West Japan Railway Company
Railway services introduced in 1988
Railway services discontinued in 1997
Railway services introduced in 2015
1988 establishments in Japan
2015 establishments in Japan
Named Shinkansen trains